Dīrghatamas (Sanskrit: दीर्घतमस्) was an ancient Indian sage well known for his philosophical verses in the Rigveda. He was author of Suktas (hymns) 140 to 164 in the first Mandala (section) of the Rigveda.

Background
Dirghatamas was one of the Angirasa Rishis, the oldest of the Rishi families, and regarded as brother to the Rishi Bharadvaja, who is the seer of the sixth Mandala of the Rig Veda. Dirghatamas is also the chief predecessor of the Gotama family of Rishis that includes Kakshivan, Gautam Maharishi, Nodhas and Vamadeva(seer of the fourth Mandala of the Rig Veda), who along  with Dirghatamas account for almost 150 of the 1000 hymns of the Rig Veda. Anga, Vanga, Kalinga, Pundra and Suhma, Ondra were also the sons of Dirghatamas through Raja Bali’s wife Sudhesana. His own verses occur frequently in many Vedic texts, a few even in the Upanishads.

He was the reputed purohit or chief priest of King Bharata (Aitareya Brahmana VIII.23), one of the earliest kings of the land, after whom India was named as Bharata (the traditional name of the country).

Birth
Dīrghatama was son of Raṣṭra.

Bhishma tells the narrative of the birth of Dirghatama Mamteya in the Mahabharata (book1, Adi Parva, CIV):
"There was in olden days a wise Rishi of the name of Utathya. He had a wife of the name Mamata whom he dearly loved. One day Utathya's younger brother Brihaspati, the priest of the celestials, endued with great energy, approached Mamata. The latter, however, told her husband's younger brother—that foremost of eloquent men—that she had conceived from her connection with his elder brother and that, therefore, he should not then seek for the consummation of his wishes. She continued, 'O illustrious Brihaspati, the child that I have conceived has studied in his mother's womb the Vedas with the six Angas, Seed is not lost in vain. How can then this womb of mine afford room for two children at a time? Therefore, it behoveth thee not to seek for the consummation of thy desire at such a time. Thus addressed by her, Brihaspati, though possessed of great wisdom, could not suppress his desire. The child in the womb protested, 'There is no space here for two. O illustrious one, the room is small. I have occupied it first. It behoveth thee not to afflict me.' But Brihaspati without listening to what that child in the womb said, sought the embraces of Mamata possessing the most beautiful pair of eyes. And the illustrious Brihaspati, beholding this, became indignant, and reproached Utathya's child and cursed him, saying, 'Because thou hast spoken to me in the way thou hast at a time of pleasure that is sought after by all creatures, perpetual darkness shall overtake thee.' And from this curse of the illustrious Brihaspati, Utathya's child who was equal unto Brihaspati in energy, was born blind and came to be called Dirghatamas (enveloped in perpetual darkness). 
And the wise Dirghatamas, possessed of a knowledge of the Vedas, though born blind, succeeded yet by virtue of his learning, in obtaining for a wife a young and handsome Brahmana maiden of the name of Pradweshi. And having married her, the illustrious Dirghatamas, for the expansion of Utathya's race, begat upon her several children with Gautama Dirghatamas as their eldest.

Marriage laws
Dirghatamas' sons were all covetous. So the sages in his hermitage left Dirghatamas for he had reared unvirtuous sons. Dirgatamas became very sad at this incident, and asked his wife, Pradeshwari whether she was also upset with him. She answered that she was dejected for DIrghatamas was blind and neither her protector (Pati) nor her supporter (Bhartri), causing her to bring up their sons by herself. Hearing this Dirghatamas became angry and laid a new law regarding marriage, that a woman could only marry once whether her husband was alive or dead.

Hearing this, Pradeshwari became exceedingly angry and asked her sons to cast their father into the Ganga. So Gautama and his brother tied Dirghatamas to a raft and threw him into the stream. A king named Bali, who was performing his ablutions, saw the sage and rescued him. In return, he asked Dirghatamas to sire sons with his wife, Queen Sudeshna through the Niyoga ritual. But Sudeshna sent a Sudra woman to the sage aware that he was blind and the sage begat eleven sons through that woman, with Kakshivata as eldest. Upon learning of Sudeshna's deception he became angry and to pacify him the king sent Sudeshna to Dirghatams. Through Sudeshna, the sage sired six sons named Anga, Vanga, Kalinga, Pundra and Cumbha, Odra who were given their namesake kingdoms.

Asya Vamasya Hymn
Dirghatamas is famous for his paradoxical apothegms. His mantras are enigmas: "He who knows the father below by what is above, and he who knows the father who is above by what is below is called the poet."

The Asya Vamasya (RgVeda 1.164) is one of the sage's most famous poems. Early scholars (such as Deussen in his Philosophy of the Upanishads) tried to say that the poems of Dirghatamas were of a later nature because of their content, but this has no linguistic support which has been argued by modern Sanskrit scholars (such as Dr. C. Kunhan Raja in his translation of the Asya Vamasya Hymn). The reason that earlier Western scholars believed them to be of a later origin is due to the monist views found there. They believed that early Vedic religion was pantheistic and a monist view of god evolved later in the Upanishads - but the poems of Dirghatamas (1.164.46) which say "there is One Being (Ekam Sat) which is called by many names" proves this idea incorrect.

Earliest mention of the Zodiac
Some scholars have claimed that the Babylonians invented the zodiac of 360 degrees around 700 BCE, perhaps even earlier, as old as the Rig Veda, the oldest Vedic text, there are clear references to a chakra or wheel of 360 spokes placed in the sky. The number 360 and its related numbers like 12, 24, 36, 48, 60, 72, 108, 432 and 720 occur commonly in Vedic symbolism. It is in the hymns of the Rishi Dirghatamas (RV I.140 - 164) that we have the clearest such references.

See also 
 List of Indian philosophers
 Rigveda

References 

 Gupta, Nolini Kanta. "Seer Poets". Sri Aurobindo Ashram, Pondicherry, 1970.
 
 Mahābhārata, Book1, Adi Parva, CIV.
 R̥g-Veda, Sūktas 140 to 164.
 Raja, Dr. C. Kunhan. Asya Vāmasya Hymn, (printed 1956).
 Singh, Prof. Satya Prakash. Life and Vision of the Vedic Seers 2: Dirghatamas. Standard Publishers, New Delhi, 2006.
 Fórizs, László. Dīrghatamas In Keréknyomok/Wheeltracks 2019/13: 148-181.
  Apāṁ Napāt, Dīrghatamas and Construction of the Brick Altar. Analysis of RV 1.143 In Vedic Investigations, edited by Asko Parpola, Masato Fujii and Stanley Insler, Volume 1, Papers of the 12th World Sanskrit Conference, Motilal Banarsidass, 2016, pp. 97–126, in the homepage of Laszlo Forizs.

Rishis